The Rockway Institute is a center for LGBT research and public policy based at the California School of Professional Psychology at Alliant International University in San Francisco, California. It was founded in 2007 and named for bisexual clinical psychologist Alan Rockway, who was active in the LGBT rights movement in Florida in the 1970s.

The group's founder and first executive director, Robert-Jay Green, described its initial organization as a group of 10 faculty members and 20 fellows with expertise in LGBT research. He said that professional research had already played a key role in advancing LGBT rights, citing early studies that lead to the decision of the American Psychiatric Association to remove homosexuality from its mental illness classification scheme in 1973. He said that "all of the currently active court cases and legislative hearings concerning same-sex marriage, LGBT parenting rights, harassment of LGBT youth in schools, and workplace discrimination against LGBT employees make very heavy use of social science and mental health research findings." As of 2015, the Institute described its mission in these terms:

Green also emphasized the importance of educating journalists in order to counter anti-gay spokespeople like James Dobson of Focus on the Family who "frequently and categorically dismiss all reputable existing research on LGBT issues" and to counter the work of discredited researchers. A spokesperson for Focus on the Family countered that "We've looked at what homosexual activists have put forward and found it lacking. It doesn't meet basic social science standards. It speaks to the desperation among homosexual activists to give credibility to their political goals."

Notes

See also

List of LGBT-related organizations

References

External links
 Official website

LGBT organizations in the United States
Alliant International University
Research institutes established in 2007
Think tanks based in the United States